Mount Zion is an unincorporated community in the town of Scott, Crawford County, Wisconsin, United States.

Mount Zion in popular culture
Mount Zion was notable when Alvin Straight rode from his home in Laurens, Iowa on a John Deere riding lawn mower to visit his ailing older brother. It was a  trip and took Straight six weeks to travel to Mount Zion.

References

Unincorporated communities in Crawford County, Wisconsin
Unincorporated communities in Wisconsin